The Red River Bowl is an annual NJCAA college football bowl game played in Bedford, Texas.

Trinity Valley Community College (TVCC) defeated Coffeyville Community College in 1997 to become the NJCAA National Champions. The 1999 Red River Bowl was for the SWJCFC Championship.

Schroeder, George. (2019-10-12) "No. 5 Oklahoma with a stingy defense and CeeDee Lamb prove too much for Texas". USA Today. Retrieved 2020-04-26.

College football bowls
American football in the Dallas–Fort Worth metroplex